Boral is a surname. People with this name include:

Ethem Servet Boral (1876–1956), Ottoman Turkish army officer
Raichand Boral (1903–1981), Indian film score composer and musician
Uğur Boral (born 1982), Turkish footballer

See also
Baral (surname), a similarly spelled surname
Boral, an Australian building and construction materials company